Saint-Esprit (French for "Holy Spirit") is a municipality in the Lanaudière region of Quebec, Canada, part of the Montcalm Regional County Municipality. It is located on both banks of the Saint-Esprit River, a tributary of the L'Assomption River.

History
The area's first settlers arrived at the end of 18th century and were mostly from L'Ange-Gardien, Beauport, and Saint-Sulpice. Originally, the area was identified as the Rivière-Saint-Esprit or Grand-Saint-Esprit Concession. In 1808, the Parish of Saint-Ours-du-Saint-Esprit was founded, however after 1838, the parish name was shortened to just Saint-Esprit to avoid confusion with another parish called Saint-Ours in the Diocese of Montreal.

In 1852, its post office opened and in 1855, the Parish Municipality of Saint-Ours-du-Saint-Esprit was formed. A century later in 1956, it followed the parish by also shortening its name to Saint-Esprit. In 2000, the parish municipality changed its status and became the Municipality of Saint-Esprit.

Economy
Because Saint-Esprit is surrounded by extensive plains, the local economy is characterized by agriculture. The main agricultural activities include tobacco and Sugar Maple cultivation, milk production, and breeding of lamb, pork and poultry.

Saint-Esprit also has an industrial park along Highway 25.

Demographics
Population trend:
 Population in 2021: 2011 (2016 to 2021 population change: 2.2%)
 Population in 2016: 1967
 Population in 2011: 1963 
 Population in 2006: 1868
 Population in 2001: 1850
 Population in 1996: 1908
 Population in 1991: 1845

Private dwellings occupied by usual residents: 900 (total dwellings: 933)

Mother tongue:
 English as first language: 0.8%
 French as first language: 97.3%
 English and French as first language: 0%
 Other as first language: 1.9%

Education

Commission scolaire des Samares operates francophone public schools, including:
 École Dominique-Savio

The Sir Wilfrid Laurier School Board operates anglophone public schools, including:
 Joliette Elementary School in Saint-Charles-Borromée
 Joliette High School in Joliette

References

Incorporated places in Lanaudière
Municipalities in Quebec